Helena Romanelli (born 1 September 1987) is a judoka from Brazil.

References

External links
 
 

Living people
1987 births
Brazilian female judoka
Place of birth missing (living people)
21st-century Brazilian women
20th-century Brazilian women